Alina Aleksandrovna Sandratskaya (born May 22, 1984) is a Russian theater and film actress, director.

Biography 
Alina Sandratskaya was born in Moscow, Russian SFSR, Soviet Union.
As a child she sang in the Moscow Chamber Musical Theatre. She graduated from the Faculty of Film and Television Theatre Moscow State Art and Cultural University. Immediately after graduation she started acting in movies.

In 2008 she was offered a major role in the telenovela Wedding Ring. In 2010 she announced that she resigned from the project, her place was taken by Alina Buzhinskaya.

In her spare time, she professionally recorded music and singing.

Personal life 
On July 14, 2010, Alina married Yuri and on March 21, 2012, she gave birth to their son. Her husband works in the firm, attended the same school.

Selected filmography
 2005 — 2006: Kulagin and Partners (TV series)
 2007: Lawyer (TV series) as Nadya
 2008: The Circus Princess (TV series) as Dina
 2008 — 2010: Wedding Ring (TV series) as Olga Prokhorova
 2013: The Surest Means (TV series) as Anna

References

External links
 
 Biography

1984 births
Living people
Russian film actresses
Russian television actresses
Russian stage actresses
Actresses from Moscow
21st-century Russian actresses
Russian directors